Wargatie Lake is a glacial lake in Manitoba, in Canada, formerly known as Dummy Lake.

Ecology
The Municipality of Harrison Park manages the lake, offering recreational fishing for northern pike, walleye, and yellow perch. Wargatie Lake also supports a large population of the northern leopard frog, a Species of Special Concern in Canada; the lake is believed to provide an overwintering habitat for the frogs.

Hydronymy
The lake was named for the family of Onofrey Wargatie, whose 1910 homestead was located nearby. Members of the family were deaf-mute, leading to the original name, Dummy Lake. In 2000, the derogatory name was rescinded and replaced with the current name, which "commemorates the family more appropriately."

See also
 List of lakes of Manitoba

References

Bibliography
 
 

Lakes of Manitoba